George Romeo Silvestri Ferez (born 23 April 1950 in La Ceiba) is a Honduran politician who currently serves as deputy of the National Congress of Honduras representing the National Party of Honduras for Islas de la Bahía.

References

1950 births
Living people
People from La Ceiba
Deputies of the National Congress of Honduras
National Party of Honduras politicians
People from Islas de la Bahía Department